St. Rose's Church, Saint Rose of Lima Church, or variations, may refer to:

Churches

United States
 St. Rose of Lima Church (Newtown, Connecticut)
 St. Rose Priory, in the St. Rose Roman Catholic Church Complex in Springfield, Kentucky
 St. Rose of Lima Catholic Church (Gaithersburg, Maryland)
 St. Rose of Lima Mission, Roman Catholic Church (Silver Lake, Missouri)
 St. Rose of Lima Catholic Church and School Complex, Crofton, Nebraska
 Saint Rose of Lima Catholic Church Reno Nevada
 St. Rose Roman Catholic Church Complex (Lima, New York)
 St. Rose of Lima Church (Manhattan), New York
 St. Rose of Lima Old Church (New York City)
 St. Rose Church (Cincinnati, Ohio)
 St. Rose's Catholic Church (St. Rose, Ohio)

Elsewhere
 St. Rose of Lima Parish Church, in Santa Rosa, Nueva Ecija
 St. Rose Cathedral, Santa Rosa de Copán, Honduras
 St. Rose of Lima Cathedral, Carúpano, Venezuela

Other
 Sainte-Rose-de-Lima, French Guiana, a village

See also

 Santa Rosa Cathedral (disambiguation)
 Rose of Lima